Michelle Lukes is a British actress from London. She trained at the prestigious Bristol Old Vic Theatre School and graduated winning the Newton Blick Award for versatility. Lukes is best known for playing series regular Sgt Julia Richmond in the Cinemax show Strike Back, Lisa Torres in the BBC drama Doctors, Mother Miranda in Resident Evil Village, and Kelly - 087 in Halo 5: Guardians and The Fall of Reach for Netflix. In 2017 Lukes won the Maverick Award at the Action on Film International Film Festival for her contribution to television. Alongside her numerous other film and television appearances, Lukes has taken on stage roles for the Royal National Theatre, Royal Shakespeare Company and the Bristol Old Vic. 

Michelle is also an accomplished singer, dancer and musician and spent several years in London's West End Theatre performing leading roles in musicals such as Chicago (musical), Cats (musical), Disney's The Lion King (musical), Starlight Express, Fosse and Joseph and the Amazing Technicolor Dreamcoat. In 2004 she was hand-picked to be the on-set Dance Supervisor for Oliver Stone's Alexander, in which she also appeared.

In 2019, Michelle stars in the movie Samir with Sprague Grayden, Ethan Rains, and Peter Greene.

Selected works

Television

Film

Videogames

Theatre

Awards

In 2017 Michelle Lukes was awarded The Maverick Award at the Action on Film International Film Festival for her work on Strike Back.

References

External links

Living people
British actresses of Chinese descent
English stage actresses
English television actresses
English voice actresses
1984 births